Harshvardhan Shahajirao Patil (born 21 August 1963), is an Indian politician from Bharatiya Janata Party from Indapur, near Pune in Maharashtra. He quit Indian National Congress in September 2019 after a long association with it.

He was one of the few ministers who was presiding as a minister for four consecutive terms (1995-2014) in Government of Maharashtra. He has shouldered responsibilities of Cooperative Ministry and currently Legislative Affairs. He is known for cordial relations with all party members.  He was a minister from 1995 to 2014.

He was elected MLA as an independent in 1995, 1999, 2004. In 2009 he was elected MLA as an Indian National Congress. candidate. He was appointed as co-operation and parliamentary affairs minister in Chief minister Prithviraj Chavan's ministry. There are tussles seen for control over Indapur between Nationalist Congress Party and Indian National Congress under his leadership.

In August 2014, he was attacked by few  activist who hurled ink at him making him injured his left eye. He was immediately taken to Baramati for primarily treatment. A few months later, in October 2014 Maharashtra Legislative Assembly Election he was defeated from Indapur constituency by Nationalist Congress Party candidate Dattatray Vithoba Bharne by margin of 14,173 votes.

He is the nephew of Shankarrao Bajirao Patil, the former MP.

External links
 http://legislativebodiesinindia.nic.in/States/Maharashtra/mpa.htm
 http://www.deccanherald.com/content/114159/maha-portfolios-patil-retains-home.html

References 

Living people
1963 births
Politicians from Pune
Maharashtra MLAs 1995–1999
Maharashtra MLAs 1999–2004
Maharashtra MLAs 2004–2009
Marathi politicians
Indian National Congress politicians from Maharashtra
Bharatiya Janata Party politicians from Maharashtra
State cabinet ministers of Maharashtra